The West End Masonic Temple is a Masonic building in Birmingham, Alabama. It was constructed in 1926. The temple served the masonic community until 1985, when it was sold and converted to office space.  The building was destroyed in a fire on New Years Day, 1996.

The building was listed on the National Register of Historic Places in 1987, and in 2009, despite being gone for many years, was still listed.

References

Neoclassical architecture in Alabama
Masonic buildings completed in 1926
Buildings and structures in Birmingham, Alabama
Former Masonic buildings in Alabama
National Register of Historic Places in Birmingham, Alabama
Clubhouses on the National Register of Historic Places in Alabama
1926 establishments in Alabama
1996 disestablishments in Alabama
Burned buildings and structures in the United States